Wedge-billed hummingbird has been split into the following species:

 Geoffroy's daggerbill, Schistes geoffroyi
 White-throated daggerbill, Schistes albogularis

Birds by common name